Arabella Black Angel is a 1989 Italian film directed by Stelvio Massi. The film stars Tinì Cansino as an unsatisfied married woman who lives a double life as a sex worker. She finds herself the main suspect in a series of murders and attempts to find the real killer.

Cast
Cast adapted from Blood & Black Lace.
 Tinì Cansino as Arabella/Deborah Veronese
 Valentina Visconti as Gena Fowler
 Francesco Casale as Francesco J. Veronese
 Carlo Mucari as De Rosa
 Renato D'Amore as Scognamillo

Production
Stelvio Massi was working on post-production on the film Taxi Killer when the producer announced the film had gone bankrupt, leading the film to be shelved. Massi moved on to direct Arabella Black Angel under the name of "Max Steel".

The film stars Tinì Cansino, who was best known in Italy for her appearances on the television series Drive In.

Release
Arabella Black Angel was released in 1989. It was released by Penthouse Video in Japan under the English title of Black Angel with an 88-minute running time. Vinegar Syndrome released the film as Arabella Black Angel as part of their Forgotten Gialli: Volume Four box set along with The Killer is Still Among Us and The Sister of Ursula.

Reception
From retrospective reviews, critic and film historian Roberto Curti found the film to be derivative of Ken Russel's Crimes of Passion (1984) and finding it bared no trace of the visual flair Massi had showcased in the past. Curti also found Cansino's acting weak when performing the more sexual scenes in the film. Adrian Luther Smith in his book Blood & Black Lace also noted that Massi "seems happy to wade around in the script's sex and violence" while finding Cansino to be what weakens the film, referring to her as an "unassured actress."

See also
 List of Italian films of 1989

References

Sources

External links
 

1989 films
1980s Italian films
1980s Italian-language films
Films directed by Stelvio Massi
Giallo films